Brissopsis atlantica is a species of sea urchin of the family Brissidae. Their armour is covered with spines. Brissopsis atlantica was first scientifically described in 1907 by Ole Theodor Jensen Mortensen.

References

Animals described in 1907
atlantica
Taxa named by Ole Theodor Jensen Mortensen